McClinton is a surname. Notable people with the surname include:

Curtis McClinton (born 1939), American football player
Delbert McClinton (born 1940), American musician
Jack McClinton (born 1985), American basketball player
James McClinton (born 1961), American politician
Lita McClinton (1953–1987), American murder victim
Kenny McClinton (born 1947), Northern Irish pastor and political activist
Marion McClinton (1954–2019), American theater director
O. B. McClinton (1940–1987), American singer-songwriter

See also
McClinton Glacier, glacier in Antarctica
McClintock (disambiguation)